Ingama is a village about 20 km south west of the present day Bulawayo, the second largest city of Zimbabwe. Ingama is about 5 km to the north of Old Bulawayo Mzilikazi's last royal residence. Old Bulawayo is now being rebuilt as the AmaNdebele are trying to resuscitate their kingdom along the lines of Zulu King Zwelithini's kingdom in South Africa. The idea being to revive the culture (tradition and norms ) of AmaNdebele nation which is under threat of extinction because of the influence of the western culture and Shona culture.

External links
Pictures of Old Bulawayo, Zimbabwe

Bulawayo
Populated places in Zimbabwe